Güven Cavus (born 23 April 1989 in Maçka, Trabzon) is a Turkish football midfielder who last played for Batman Petrolspor.

References

1989 births
Living people
Association football forwards
Belgian footballers
Turkish footballers
Belgian expatriate footballers
Expatriate footballers in the Netherlands
MVV Maastricht players
Eerste Divisie players
Belgian people of Turkish descent